The 1987 Soviet First League was the 48th season of the second tier of association football in the Soviet Union.

Teams

Promoted teams
FC Geolog Tyumen – (Returning after 25 seasons)
FC Zaria Voroshilovgrad – (Returning after 2 seasons)
FC Krylya Sovetov Kuibyshev – (Returning after a season)

Relegated teams 
FC Chernomorets Odessa – (Returning after a season)
FC Torpedo Kutaisi – (Returning after 2 seasons)

League standings

Top scorers

Number of teams by union republic

See also
 Soviet First League

External links
1987. First League. (1987. Первая лига.) Luhansk Nash Futbol.

Soviet First League seasons
2
Soviet
Soviet